Anixia is a genus of fungi that belongs to the Agaricomycetes class; it is not assigned to an order or a family. The Anixia genus consists of twelve fungi species. The genus was first documented in 1819 by Swedish mycologist Elias Magnus Fries.

References 

Incertae sedis
Agaricomycetes
Agaricomycetes genera